Mylari is a 2010 Kannada film that has Shiva Rajkumar and Sadha in the lead and is directed by R. Chandru of  Taj Mahal (movie) fame.

Cast

 Shiva Rajkumar as Mylari 
 Sadha as Anitha 
 Sanjjanaa Galrani 
 Rangayana Raghu
 Ravi Kale as Jailer 
 Bullet Prakash
 Kuri Prathap
 Lakshman Rao 
 Madhugiri Prakash 
 Gaurish akki 
 Mandya Jayaram 
 Suresh Heblikar 
 John Kokken 
 Kote Prabhakar 
 Dileep Kumar 
 Umesh Punga 
 Suchendra Prasad 
 Suresh Mangalore 
 Yashas Surya 
 Vijaya Sarathi 
 Guru Prasad 
 Danny Kuttappa 
 Vidya murthy 
 Rekha. V. Kumar 
 Padmaja Rao

Soundtrack
Mylari audio released by Anand Audio is set to create a record in the history of Kannada film music. It was first film in 2010 to sell 540 audio CDs and cassettes in the first two days of its release .

Reception

Critical response 

R G Vijayasarathy of Rediff.com scored the film at 3 out of 5 stars and says "This is definitely both Chandru's and Shivanna's 'sure shot' at erasing their past mistakes. All in all, Mylari is a good entertainer". A critic from The New Indian Express wrote "Meanwhile, the SP (Ravi Kale) of the area wants to know about Mylari. The movie is a worth watch for those who want to see the dancing skills of hattrick hero Shivaraj Kumar". A critic from The Times of India scored the film at 3.5 out of 5 stars and wrote "While Sada wins your heart with her excellent expressions and few dialogues, Sanjana shines in her lively and mischievous role. Suchendra Prasad rightly fits the role of a politician. K S Chandrashekar gives some brilliant cinematography". A critic from Bangalore Mirror wrote  "The film has all the commercial trappings of a village-boy-caught-in-a-city story, which Shiva Rajkumar has made his own. The film is not in the same class as Jogi or Om, even though Puneeth croons in the title song that Mylari is not Jogi or Om's Sathya. Very true". B S Srivani from Deccan Herald wrote "Sada looks famished, Rangayana Raghu and Guruprasad irritate and Suchendra Prasad’s mumbling doesn’t help his essay of villainy. The others are hardly missed. Cinematography shines, while the same is not true of music. Shivanna fans will definitely love Mylari along with families of course".

References

External links 

2010s Kannada-language films
2010 films
Films scored by Gurukiran
Films directed by R. Chandru